Louis de Wohl (earlier Ludwig von Wohl, born Lajos Theodor Gaspar Adolf Wohl) was a German-born Catholic author, and had served as an astrologer notable for his work with MI5 from England during World War II. Sixteen of his popular pre-war novels were the basis of movies. His later novels are literary hagiographies of notable Roman Catholic saints and of different periods of the Bible.

Life
Wohl was born in Berlin to a poor Catholic family, with a Hungarian father and Austrian mother of Jewish descent. When he was only 17 years old, his mother pushed him into an apprenticeship to a banker, from which he was dismissed in 1924, at the age of 21. In 1935, he emigrated to England due to his objections to the Nazi regime. Some sources claim that he there had a wife named Alexandra, who fled to Santiago, Chile, where she claimed to be a Romanian princess and was known as "La Baronessa."

Wohl worked as an astrologer for the British intelligence agency MI5 during World War II. His MI5 file was released in early 2008. He was recruited initially by Sir Charles Hambro, then running the Special Operations Executive, to devise black propaganda for use against Germany, and allegedly as an informant because he was casting horoscopes for people of interest to MI5. In May 1941 he was sent to America to contribute to astrological magazines and newspapers which at the time were using articles by astrologers favourable to Nazi Germany. 

In the United States, Wohl published many articles, lectured against Germany and was interviewed several times by the press. He then returned to England in February 1942, claiming that he had been promised a commission in the British Army. Sefton Delmer, a notable purveyor of black propaganda, arranged a fake document certifying de Wohl as a Captain in the British Army, and he took to wearing the uniform (though he refrained when he realized the position was untenable). His main value to Delmer was his contact with Karl Ernst Krafft, the German astrologer working in Berlin for Dr Goebbels. He assisted Delmer in forging copies of Krafft's magazine Zenit, German, and other astrological magazines dropped over Germany, and 'foretelling' the destruction of U-boats. Delmer nevertheless continued to employ him until the end of the war, and considered his contribution valuable.

During the war, Wohl became increasingly religious, and he had a successful postwar career writing novels regarding Roman Catholic Church history and the lives of the saints.

In 1953, Wohl married Ruth Magdalene Lorch, who was a Lady Commander of the Order of the Holy Sepulchre. He himself held the title of Knight Commander of the Order.

Wohl died in Switzerland in 1961, shortly after finishing his final work, Founded on a Rock.

Writing career

He began writing as early as the age of 7. His teachers praised his ability.  At the age of 8 he wrote the play "Jesus of Nazareth" because he didn't like how Jesus was portrayed by some books he read. Writing as Ludwig von Wohl, he became quite a successful novelist during his youth in Germany, where sixteen of his novels were turned into films. The best known of these was the 1934 comedy classic Die englische Heirat (The English Marriage).

In an audience with Pope Pius XII he was told to "write about the history and mission of the Church in the World." The Cardinal of Milan, Ildefonso Schuster, came to de Wohl after reading some of his writings telling him "Let your writings be good. For your writings you will one day be judged."  From that time, he allegedly believed that he had to write for God, and felt that his earlier novels in the German language were of 'small significance compared to the novels he wrote for the glory of God'.

His novel The Spear brought him international acclaim. Even now Louis de Wohl's books are widely read.  His non-fiction work, Founded on a Rock: A History of the Catholic Church is often required reading for RCIA students. He has written books on St. Benedict, St. Francis of Assisi, Joan of Arc, and Constantine I among many others.

List of works
Der große Kampf, 1926
Das indische Wunder – Jack McGills geheime Sendung, 1926
Der Präsident von Costa Nueva – Der Roman eines Abenteurers, 1927
Miss Lillebil aus USA, 1928
Lord Spleen, 1928
Knockout Europa, 1928
Punks kommt aus Amerika, 1929
Er und Sie und sehr viel Schwindel, 1929
Die verspielte Prinzessin – Ein Filmroman zwischen Berlin, Hollywood und Kairo, 1929
Um weißes Gift, 1930
Der Vagabund vom Äquator, 1930
Das Testament des Cornelius Gulden, 1930
Die Wohnung, die über Nacht verschwand, 1931
Die Göttin der tausend Katzen, 1931
Der Mann, der die Anleihe stahl, 1931
Der Mann aus der Hölle, 1931
Peter im Pech, 1932
Die weiße Frau des Maharadscha, 1932
Die goldene Wolke, 1932
Der unsichtbare Reporter, 1932
Schwarz ist weiß und weiß ist schwarz, 1933
Kopfsprung ins Leben, 1933
Das große Erlebnis, 1933
Panik im Paradies, 1934
Die Reise nach Pretoria, 1934
Die englische Heirat, 1934
Die Deutschen von Tschau-Fu, 1934
Blutsbrüder, 1934
Tropenluft, 1935
Es kommt ein Mann nach Belawan – Ein Roman auf Sumatra, 1935
Die Türme des Schweigens, 1936
I Follow my Stars, 1937
Secret Service of the Sky, 1938
Common-sense Astrology, 1940
Strange Daughter, 1946
The Living Wood (Emperor Constantine and St. Helena), 1947
Throne of the World (Attila the Hun and Pope Leo I), 1949
Imperial Renegade (Emperor Julian the Apostate and St. Athanasius), 1950
The Quiet Light (St. Thomas Aquinas), 1950
The Restless Flame (St. Augustine of Hippo), 1951
The Golden Thread (St. Ignatius Loyola), 1952
The Stars of War & Peace, 1952
Set All Afire (St. Francis Xavier), 1953
The Second Conquest, 1954
The Spear  (St. Longinus), 1955
The Last Crusader (Don Juan of Austria and The Battle of Lepanto), 1956
Saint Joan: The Girl Soldier (St. Joan of Arc), 1957
The Glorious Folly (St. Paul the Apostle), 1957
The Joyful Beggar (St. Francis of Assisi), 1958
Citadel of God (St. Benedict of Nursia), 1959
Adam, Eve, and the Ape, 1960
Founded on a Rock: A History of the Catholic Church, 1961
Lay Siege to Heaven (St. Catherine of Siena), 1961
David of Jerusalem (King David), 1963
Pope Pius XII: Shepherd to the World

Selected filmography
My Friend Harry, directed by Rudolf Walther-Fein and Max Obal  (1928, based on the novel Das indische Wunder)
The Criminal of the Century, directed by Max Obal  (1928, based on the novel Jimmy der Schwerverbrecher)
The President, directed by Gennaro Righelli  (1928, based on the novel Der Präsident von Costa Nueva)
A Girl with Temperament, directed by Victor Janson  (1928, based on the novel Miss Lillebil aus USA)
Once You Give Away Your Heart, directed by Johannes Guter  (1929, based on the novel Der Vagabund vom Äquator)
Die Jagd nach der Million, directed by Rudolf Walther-Fein and Max Obal  (1930, based on the novel Lord Spleen)
The Testament of Cornelius Gulden, directed by E. W. Emo  (1932, based on the novel Das Testament des Cornelius Gulden)
The Legacy of Pretoria, directed by Johannes Meyer  (1934, based on the novel Die Reise nach Pretoria)
The English Marriage, directed by Reinhold Schünzel  (1934, based on the novel Die englische Heirat)
 Punks Arrives from America, directed by Karlheinz Martin  (1935, based on the novel Punks kommt aus Amerika)
The Love of the Maharaja, directed by Arthur Maria Rabenalt  (German-language version, 1936, based on the novel Die weiße Frau des Maharadscha)
A Woman Between Two Worlds, directed by Goffredo Alessandrini  (Italian-language version, 1936, based on the novel Die weiße Frau des Maharadscha)
Crime Over London, directed by Alfred Zeisler  (1936, based on the novel House of a Thousand Windows)
Francis of Assisi, directed by Michael Curtiz  (1961, based on the novel The Joyful Beggar)

Screenwriter 
 The Sweet Girl (dir. Manfred Noa, 1926)
 Crooks in Tails (dir. Manfred Noa, 1927)
 The Eighteen Year Old (dir. Manfred Noa, 1927)
 The Last Company (dir. Curtis Bernhardt, 1930)
 Love's Carnival (dir. Hans Steinhoff, 1930)
 Abenteuer im Engadin (dir. Max Obal, 1932)
 The Oil Sharks (French-language version, dir. Rudolph Cartier and Henri Decoin, 1933)
 Invisible Opponent (German-language version, dir. Rudolph Cartier, 1933)
 Homecoming to Happiness (dir. Carl Boese, 1933)
 Decoy (German-language version, dir. Hans Steinhoff, 1934)
 The Decoy (French-language version, dir. Roger Le Bon and Hans Steinhoff, 1935)
 Make-Up (dir. Alfred Zeisler, 1937)
 Dein Horoskop – Dein Schicksal? (documentary on astrology, dir. Konrad Lustig, 1956)

References

External links 
 Louis de Wohl and Nostradamus
 Emma Garman, The Inconvenient Astrologer Of MI5
 Dr. Felix Jay, The Louis de Wohl I knew
 
 Article on de Wohl: "UK hired astrologer in WWII fight"
 Autobiographical writing – Catholicauthors.com
 "de Wohl's MI5 file released"
 The Guardian: "Star turn: astrologer who became SOE's secret weapon against Hitler"

1903 births
1961 deaths
Writers from Berlin
British astrologers
British Roman Catholics
Christian astrologers
Hungarian male novelists
German people of Hungarian descent
German Roman Catholics
German emigrants to England
Roman Catholic writers
20th-century German novelists
Knights of the Holy Sepulchre
German people of Austrian-Jewish descent
Naturalised citizens of the United Kingdom
British people of Hungarian descent
British people of Austrian-Jewish descent
Jews who immigrated to the United Kingdom to escape Nazism
20th-century Hungarian novelists
20th-century Hungarian male writers